Acinetospora is a genus of brown algae in the family Acinetosporaceae.

Species
Algaebase lists the following species:

Acinetospora asiatica Yaegashi, Yamagishi & Kogame
Acinetospora crinita (Carmichael) Sauvageau
Acinetospora filamentosa (Noda) Yaegashi, Uwai & Kogame
Acinetospora nicholsoniae Hollenberg

References

Ectocarpales
Brown algae genera